Farmers Electric Cooperative is a non-profit rural electric utility cooperative headquartered in Greenville, Texas with offices in Wylie and Sulphur Springs.

Founded in 1937, Farmers Electric Cooperative is a member-owned electric utility serving more than 50,000 homes and businesses in the fast-growing region spanning Dallas, Collin, Rockwall, Hunt, Kaufman, Rains, Hopkins, Delta, Franklin, Fannin, Van Zandt, and Wood counties.

External links
Farmers Electric Cooperative Corporation (Texas)

Companies based in Texas
Electric cooperatives in Texas
Collin County, Texas
Dallas County, Texas
Delta County, Texas
Fannin County, Texas
Franklin County, Texas
Hopkins County, Texas
Hunt County, Texas
Kaufman County, Texas
Rains County, Texas
Rockwall County, Texas
Van Zandt County, Texas
Wood County, Texas